The New Zealand DH class locomotive is a type of diesel-electric heavy transfer and shunting locomotive in New Zealand's national railway network. The class consists of six heavy shunt U10B type locomotives built by General Electric United States at their Erie, Pennsylvania plant in 1978. Five of the class are used in the Auckland area for heavy shunting duties, including services around Auckland and the Port of Auckland, while one is based at the Port of Tauranga in Mount Maunganui.

Introduction 
Originally an order for Philippine National Railways 2500 Class, the six locomotives were purchased as by coincidence NZR needed a heavy shunter for Auckland container port transfer work. At the time two DSC class shunters were linked in tandem to perform this task.

They saw occasional service on the then under-used Auckland suburban passenger network where they performed well, but NZR focused them on their intended purpose, heavy shunting. In the late 1980s, NZR provided a DH locomotive to the Tasman Pulp and Paper mill in Kawerau to trial for sale as a heavy shunter in the mill's rail yards. The mill turned down the offer, instead, they purchased a DA class locomotive to perform shunting duties. In July 1979 DH905 was trialled at the Te Rapa marshalling yards in Hamilton, but the trial was unsuccessful and the locomotive returned to Auckland later that year. All DH locomotives were allocated to Westfield (Auckland) in 1990.

Classification 
The class should not be confused with the English Electric DH class of 1956; as all of the old DHs had been reclassified as DG in 1968, the classification was re-used.

Upgrades 

The locomotives were upgraded in the late 1990s with shunters refuges at the front and back of the locomotives, in line with other New Zealand shunting locomotives at the time. In the 2010s the class were upgraded again for multiple unit (MU) operation.

Other users

The Hedjaz Jordan Railway has three GE U10B locomotives of  gauge. These are of A1A-A1A wheel arrangement. Another user is the Belgrano Sur Line (Buenos Aires), Argentina.
The Bogotá Savannah Railway has two GE U10B locomotives

References

Footnotes

Citations

Bibliography

 
 
 
 

DH class
Bo-Bo locomotives
Railway locomotives introduced in 1978
General Electric locomotives